"Unborn Love" is a song by German recording artist C. C. Catch. It was written by C.C. Catch and Juan Martinez. The song was released digitally on September 1, 2010 by Internacional Artist Group Music.

Charts

2010 singles
C. C. Catch songs
2010 songs